Jainemys (meaning "Jain's Turtle") is an extinct genus of bothremydid pleurodiran turtle that has been found in the Lameta Formation, India. Originally described by Sohan Lal Jain in 1977 under the name "Carteremys" pisdurensis, the species was transferred to the new genus Jainemys by Joyce & Bandyopadhyay in 2020.

The holotype of Jainemys is a partial cranium, and the only element assigned to "Carteremys" not to be reassigned to another genus.

References 

Prehistoric turtle genera
Fossils of India
Bothremydidae
Late Cretaceous turtles of Asia
Fossil taxa described in 2020